Gwendolyn Buray Ecleo-Pols (born August 25, 1974) is a Filipino politician who has been the unopposed Mayor of Dinagat, Dinagat Islands, Philippines since May 2004 until 2013, and also the Philippine Benevolent Missionaries Association, Incorporated (PBMA, INC.) Princess.

Biography 
Ecleo is the youngest daughter of the late Supreme President of P.B.M.A & the former longest running Mayor of Dinagat Islands, Ruben Edera Ecleo, Sr. and Glenda B. Ecleo, the former Congresswoman who is now the Governor of the province of Dinagat Islands. As for her primary education, Ecleo went to Saint Theresa's College of Cebu City, in Cebu City. She went to high school in La Consolacion College Manila and continued her studies in Don Jose Ecleo Memorial Foundation and graduated in the year 1990. She attended college and graduated in Centro Escolar University with a degree in Doctor of Dental Medicine (DMD) in the year 2001.

In 2004, Gwendolyn Ecleo ran for and won the Mayor's position in Dinagat, Dinagat Islands to replace her brother, Allan B. Ecleo I, who is now the incumbent Mayor of Basilisa, Dinagat Islands.

In her 3rd term as mayor, Ecleo progressed on a lot of projects specifically on these guided terms which she developed: H-EALTH, E-DUCATION, L-IVELIHOOD, P-ROTECTION TO ENVIRONMENT, !-NFRASTRUCTURE (H.E.L.P ! Pangga Dinagat).

She was also elected national auditor of the Philippines International Sisterhood and Twinning Association (PHISTA).

In 2013, she was succeeded by her biological son, also unopposed, Mayor Craig Ecleo.

Achievements and recognition 
All these projects were honored by the Local Government Unit (LGU)

As projects were in progress, honorary titles were awarded as:

 2008–2010 National Presidential Spokesperson
 2010–2013 National Auditor of LMMAP
 LMMAP/Nat'l directorate 
 2010–2013 National Chairman of special investigation and grievance committee
 LMP Chapter President of Dinagat Islands
 DOH/Gawad Int'l Awardee/Youth of the Philippines
 Top Performer of Mindanao- DAR
 Most Outstanding Local Chief Executive in Support to DEPED programs & in DOH
 Sec. Lapuz Awardee
 Seal of Goodhouse keeping – DILG
 Successfully finished the Leaders for Health Program in Ateneo School of Business
 Chairperson South Area Health Board
 An advocate to MDG health, education and poverty alleviation programs
 Currently a scholar of the Local Government Academy (LGA), University of the Philippines - Los Baños (Masters of Development and Governance Management)

The finished and on-going projects with the strict implementation of NG and COA:

Health & Education: Water system, Brgy. Health stations, Classrooms, 100 HS Scholarship, Dispersal, Philhealth, Free hospitalization, Operation bukol (care of Gov. Glenda B. Ecleo), Ambulance, Medicines, ZERO waste management, Free circumcision & immunization, 1 town, 1 scholar

Livelihood: carabaos, goats, pigs, fish sanctuary, sea weeds, lapu-lapu, lobsters, crab production, banig & dinagat hat souvenirs, mariculture, cold-storage, rice production

Protection to environment: Fruit trees & plant a tree program, Patrol boat for illegal fishing, Patrol car for crime watch, beautification, post-harvest facilities, solar drier

Infrastructure: Brgy. Hall, Kalahi, Gymnasium, Housing, Road w/ drainage, bridge, Library hub, Botica sa Brgy., Sea wall, New Police Station, farm to market road, road widening & maintenance.

References
League of Municipalities of the Philippines 

1974 births
Living people
Filipino politicians convicted of crimes
Mayors of places in Dinagat Islands
Centro Escolar University alumni
Gwendolyn